The 2016 McGrath Cup was an inter-county Gaelic football competition in the province of Munster, played by the six county teams. It was won by Cork.

Format
The teams are drawn into two groups of three teams. Each team plays the other teams in its group once, earning 2 points for a win and 1 for a draw. The two group winners play in the final.

Results

Group A

Group B

Finals

References

McGrath Cup
McGrath Cup